Marguerite Mahood (née Callaway) is a celebrated Australian graphic artist, ceramicist, sculptor, author and historian. Mahood was a prolific writer, and produced a number of articles and texts for The Australian Home Beautiful journal. Mahood was a key founder of many Australian artistic societies.

Early Life and Education 

Marguerite Henriette Callaway was born on 29 July 1901 in Richmond, Victoria. She was the eldest of four siblings of Henry George Callaway and Marguerite Gabrielle Callaway (née Deschamps).

After schooling at Presbyterian Ladies’ College in East Melbourne, Mahood attended the National Gallery School (now VCA) to study drawing under Frederick McCubbin and William Beckwith McInnes.

in the 1930s, Mahood attended classes in applied arts at the Working Men's College (the predecessor to RMIT), and studied independently with Leslie Wilkie.

On 16 June 1923 at the Independent Church, Collins Street, she married with Congregational forms Thomas Orrock George Mahood, an engineer.

Career 
Mahood first exhibited with the Victorian Artists' Society in 1925 with a series of linocut prints.

In 1926 Mahood became one of the first women in Australia to broadcast her own radio program, presenting a popular weekly discussion of art and architecture on the forerunner to the ABC between 1926 and 1929.

Mahood's ceramic practice became known for their decorative and vibrating glazing, with intricate filigree patterning. She often produced humorous pieces which brought her commercial success and public profile. Mahood's approach to her ceramic practice was to overcome production-line style pieces, and therefore made works which could not be produced on a production line. Mahood made many 'double-filigree' items, which few have been able to copy.

Her 1932 exhibition at Everyman's Library was so successful the prestigious Sedon Galleries asked her to exhibit with them. From 1932 until the 1950s Mahood’s regular exhibitions received positive reviews. She was included in William Moore’s The Story of Australian Art (1934), the first national survey of the field.

A founding member of the Australian Ceramic Society and the Victorian Sculptors’ Society, Mahood also wrote articles in Australian Home Beautiful that advised amateur potters—women in particular—on the ceramic process.  Other articles dealt with the history of pottery and the Australian ceramics industry, which she vigorously promoted.

Mahood’s ceramic work eased after the birth of her son, Martin, in 1938. The increasing popularity of stoneware, changing taste in art and interior decoration, and her age influenced Mahood’s decision to cease her ceramic practice. She continued to produce artworks throughout her life, including a range of sculpted metal works and in her later years focused on sinuous linoprints of animals.

Later Career and Life 
During the 1940s and 1950s, Mahood ran a screenprinting business. As Margot Mahood, she became a popular children’s cartoonist, writing and illustrating The Whispering Stone: An Australian Nature Fantasy (1944), and Drawing Australian Animals (1952).

Beyond the 1950 Mahood was a contributor to Wild Life magazine and her series on How to Draw Australian Animals resulted from this work. The Audubon Society of Canada, which publishes Conservation and Nature activities and articles, wrote to her and she produced a similar series on how to draw Canadian animals. A number of her children's books were published.

Mahood returned to academics earning a Master of Arts in 1965 and PhD in history in 1970 from the University of Melbourne. Her doctoral thesis was published in 1973 by the University of Melbourne Press, titled The Loaded Line: Australian Political Caricature 1788 – 1901. Mahood believed that the newspaper cartoon reflected the 'man in the street's' view of history and developed this argument, notwithstanding advice that it would not produce a satisfactory thesis. 'The Loaded Line' is now regarded as a seminal study of Australian cartoons and the definitive reference on Australian Political Cartoons up to Federation. Mahood ultimately became an acknowledged expert on the early Australian cartoonists and lithographers. Described in 1970 as a 'youthful, comfortably built woman' with grey, curly hair and hazel eyes, she continued to work in this field well into her eighties.

Mahood's archive is held at the Women's Art Register in Melbourne. While the Sydney Technological (Powerhouse) Museum was the only institution to acquire her ceramics during her lifetime, her work is now held in regional, state, national, and international collections.

Death 
Marguerite Mahood died on 14 October 1989 in Toorak, Melbourne. She is survived by her son and two grandsons.

Exhibitions 

 November 1932: Solo exhibition at Everyman's Library 
 November 1933: Solo exhibition at Everyman's Library 
 19–30 November 1933: Solo exhibition at Sedon Galleries
 23 November - 5 December 1936: Exhibition at Hogan Gallery 
 March 1947: Solo exhibition at David Jones' Gallery 
 17–23 October 1997: From the Earth I Arise: The Ceramics of Marguerite Mahood, Ballarat Fine Art Gallery

References

Further reading 

 William Moore, The story of Australian art: From the earliest known art of the continent to the art of to-day, Angus and Robertson, Sydney, 1934.
 Mahood, Marguerite, The Loaded Line: Australian Political Caricature 1788 - 1901, Melbourne University Press, Melbourne, 1973.
 The Printmakers, Important Woman Artists Gallery, Catalogue Melbourne, 1977.
 Germaine Max, Artists and Galleries of Australia, Boolarong Publications, 1984.
 Alisa Bunbury, Mahood, Marguerite Henriette (1901 – 1989), Australian Dictionary of Biography, Volume 18, Melbourne University Press, Melbourne, 2012.

1901 births
1989 deaths
Australian potters
Artists from Melbourne
Australian women painters
20th-century Australian women artists
20th-century Australian artists
Women potters
20th-century ceramists
Australian women ceramicists
University of Melbourne alumni
Australian historians
National Gallery of Victoria Art School alumni
People educated at the Presbyterian Ladies' College, Melbourne